Yaroslava Oleksiyivna Mahuchikh (born 19 September 2001) is a Ukrainian high jumper. She was the 2020 Summer Olympics bronze medalist, 2019 and 2022 World Championships silver medalist, and 2022 World Indoor Championships gold medalist.

At the 2022 Brussels Diamond League, Mahuchikh jumped 2.05 m, which is her outdoor personal best and a Ukrainian record. In 2021, she achieved her indoor personal best of 2.06 m, which is also a national record.

Career
Yaroslava Mahuchikh started the high jump at the age of 13, and she was able to improve significantly in two years. At the age of 15, she won the gold medal at the 2017 IAAF World U18 Championships in Nairobi by the largest margin in World U18 Championships history with her personal best of 1.92 m. She equaled the championship record of her compatriot Iryna Kovalenko from 2003 and set an unofficial world record for a 15-year-old. A few weeks later, she won the high jump event at the 2017 European Youth Olympic Festival in Győr with a clearance of 1.89 m.

In 2018, Mahuchikh cleared 1.94 m at the European U18 Championships and won the gold medal by 10 cm over the runner-up, setting a new championship record. In October, she won the gold medal at the Youth Olympic Games in Buenos Aires with a combined height of 3.87 m and set a new personal best of 1.95 m at stage 2. A month after her Youth Olympic success, Mahuchikh improved her personal best to 1.96 m and equaled the World U18 best in an annual indoor meeting in Minsk.

During the 2019 indoor season, Mahuchikh jumped 1.99 m at the Miloslava Hübnerová Memorial in Hustopeče and equaled Vashti Cunningham's U20 World record. In the outdoor season, she won the opening meeting of the 2019 Diamond League in Doha with an outdoor personal best of 1.96 m and became the youngest athlete ever to win a Diamond League event at the age of 17 years and 226 days. In September, she jumped 2.04 m at the World Championships in Doha, winning the silver medal and breaking the world U20 record. Mahuchikh was voted the European Athletics Female Rising Star that year.

In January 2020, Mahuchikh jumped 2.01 m in Lviv, a new world U20 indoor record, which she broke again a few days later when she jumped over 2.02 m in Karlsruhe.

In February 2021, Mahuchikh cleared 2.06 m at Banská Bystrica, the highest any woman had jumped indoors since 2012. In August, she won the bronze medal in the high jump event at the 2020 Summer Olympics in Tokyo.

In March 2022, days after fleeing the Russian invasion of Ukraine, Mahuchikh claimed the gold medal in the high jump at the World Athletics Indoor Championships in Belgrade. She had to undertake a three-day journey of 2000 km by car from Ukraine to Serbia to compete at the championships. Later that year, Mahuchikh won the silver medal at the World Championships in Eugene, Oregon, and the gold medal at the European Championships in Munich. In September, she won the high jump at the Brussels Diamond League meeting with a world-leading 2.05 m, which is also a Ukrainian national record.

International competitions

Personal bests

Notes

References

External links

Yaroslava Mahuchikh at European Athletics

2001 births
Living people
Sportspeople from Dnipro
Ukrainian female high jumpers
Athletes (track and field) at the 2020 Summer Olympics
Medalists at the 2020 Summer Olympics
Olympic bronze medalists in athletics (track and field)
Olympic bronze medalists for Ukraine
Olympic athletes of Ukraine
World Athletics Championships medalists
World Athletics Championships athletes for Ukraine
World Athletics Indoor Championships winners
Diamond League winners
European Athletics Championships winners
European Athletics Indoor Championships winners
Athletes (track and field) at the 2018 Summer Youth Olympics
Youth Olympic gold medalists in athletics (track and field)
Youth Olympic gold medalists for Ukraine
World Youth Championships in Athletics winners
21st-century Ukrainian women